Elections to the Territorial Council were held in the French overseas collectivity of Saint Martin for the first time on 1 July and 8 July 2007. As no list received an absolute majority of the vote in the first round, all lists with more than 10% of the vote contested a second round, in which the list of Louis Constant-Fleming obtained a relative majority.

Results

References

Saint Martin Territorial Council election
Saint Martin
Elections in the Collectivity of Saint Martin
Saint Martin